Attica Main Street Historic District is a national historic district located at Attica, Fountain County, Indiana. The district encompasses 36 contributing buildings, 1 contributing site, and 2 contributing structures in a predominantly residential section of Attica.  It developed between about 1840 and 1940, and includes notable examples of Late Victorian, Greek Revival, and Federal style architecture.  Located in the district is the separately listed Marshall M. Milford House.  Other notable contributing resources include McDonald Park, Parker-Clark House, Attica Presbyterian Church (1849), Ziegler House (c. 1834), Rolphing-Colvert Home, "Ladies Library" (1889), former Church of Christ (1891), and Attica Methodist Church (1921).

It was listed on the National Register of Historic Places in 1994.

References

Victorian architecture in Indiana
Greek Revival architecture in Indiana
Federal architecture in Indiana
Historic districts in Fountain County, Indiana
National Register of Historic Places in Fountain County, Indiana
Historic districts on the National Register of Historic Places in Indiana